Edmond Haan (25 May 1924 – 15 August 2018) was a French football striker.

External links
 Profile at racingstub.com
 
 
 Profile at FFF 

1924 births
2018 deaths
People from Schorndorf
Sportspeople from Stuttgart (region)
French footballers
France international footballers
Association football forwards
RC Strasbourg Alsace players
Nîmes Olympique players
Ligue 1 players
ASPV Strasbourg players
Ligue 2 players
Footballers from Baden-Württemberg